Carbon negative architecture is architecture whose construction, operation and eventual demolition results in more atmospheric carbon and greenhouse gasses removed from the atmosphere than that which is emitted as consequence of the same. This is achieved by rigorous planning, regenerative architectural design and on-site carbon sequestration.  Such buildings go beyond the carbon-neutral or net-zero approach, which simply means that buildings can still emit CO2 as long as the operators offset (or remove) those emissions from the atmosphere by the same amount in other places.

Features 
Some features of zero or carbon negative buildings are:

 Minimised use of fossil fuel energy in the supply chain and construction process.
 The use of materials which store atmospheric carbon in the building fabric.
 Minimised emissions of greenhouse gases during the lifetime and eventual demolition o the building.
 Capture, generation and export of renewable energy.
 Control of airtightness and/or ventilation and breathability of structure depending on climate.
 Durable, resilient, low-maintenance, fire- and weather-resistant structure.
 High level of insulation where appropriate.

See also 

 Carbon dioxide removal
 Passive house

References 

Sustainable building
Carbon dioxide removal